The 2019–20 Michigan State Spartans women's basketball team represented Michigan State University during the 2019–20 NCAA Division I women's basketball season. The Spartans, led by 13th-year head coach Suzy Merchant, played their home games at the Breslin Center in East Lansing, Michigan as members of the Big Ten Conference.

Roster

Schedule and results

|-
!colspan=9 style=| Exhibition

|-
!colspan=9 style=| Non-conference regular season

|-
!colspan=9 style=| Big Ten regular season

|-
!colspan=9 style=|Big Ten tournament

Rankings
2019–20 NCAA Division I women's basketball rankings

See also
2019–20 Michigan State Spartans men's basketball team

References

Michigan State
Michigan
Michigan
Michigan State Spartans women's basketball seasons